Eulepidotis junetta is a moth of the family Erebidae first described by Harrison Gray Dyar Jr. in 1914. It is found in the Neotropics, including Panama and Costa Rica.

References

Moths described in 1914
junetta